Stephen Chatman  (born 28 February 1950) is an American-born Canadian composer residing in Vancouver. His compositions have been performed across Canada and in the United States.

Early life and education
Chatman was born in Faribault, Minnesota, and studied with Joseph R. Wood and Walter Aschaffenburg at the Oberlin Conservatory and with Ross Lee Finney, Leslie Bassett, William Bolcom, and Eugene Kurtz at the University of Michigan in Ann Arbor, completing a D.M.A. degree in 1977. He also received a Fulbright grant for study with Karlheinz Stockhausen at the Hochschule für Musik in Cologne in 1974.

Career
In 1976, Chatman joined the faculty of the University of British Columbia, in Vancouver. He composed a number of musical works in the 1980s, including the suite There Is Sweet Music There for chorus and oboe, and the choral work Due North.

Chatman became Head of the Composition Division of the UBC School of Music in 1977 and was promoted to Professor in 1987.

He was named a Member of the Order of Canada in July 2012. In 2010 his composition "Magnificat" was his third nomination for a Juno Award. He has received three BMI Awards to Student Composers and four Western Canadian Music Awards for Outstanding Composition.

In 2017, an album of Chatman's compositions, Dawn of Night, sung  by the University of Toronto MacMillan Singers, was released by Centrediscs. His comic opera Choir Practice, created with Tara Wohlberg, was performed by the University of British Columbia Opera Ensemble.

Notable students
John Burge, Richard Covey, Arne Eigenfeldt, John Estacio, Melissa Hui, Jocelyn Morlock, Jason Nett, Larry Nickel, John Oliver, and Rui Shi Zhuo.

References
 

Footnotes

External links
Biography on the composer's homepage.
Stephen Chatman. AllMusic.

Canadian classical composers
20th-century classical composers
21st-century classical composers
1950 births
Living people
Members of the Order of Canada
University of Michigan School of Music, Theatre & Dance alumni
Pupils of Karlheinz Stockhausen
Canadian male classical composers
20th-century Canadian composers
20th-century Canadian male musicians
21st-century Canadian male musicians
Oberlin Conservatory of Music alumni
Fulbright alumni